Key Hole (KH) is the designation for a series of American optical reconnaissance satellites:

 KH-1 Corona
 KH-2 Corona
 KH-3 Corona
 KH-4 Corona
 KH-5 Argon
 KH-6 Lanyard
 KH-7 Gambit
 KH-8 Gambit 3
 KH-9 Hexagon/Big Bird
 KH-10 Dorian/Manned Orbiting Laboratory
 KH-11 Crystal/Kennan
 KH-12 Improved Crystal/Ikon/Advanced Kennan
 KH-13 (unofficial designation, sometimes applied to Enhanced Imaging System or Misty)